NRP Gonçalo Velho was a second class  sloop (aviso de 2ª classe) of the Portuguese Navy. She was designed to operate in the overseas territories of Portugal. The ship entered service in 1933 and was among the core of the fleet until the late 1940s. Following World War II, new ships were acquired and Gonçalo Velho was broken up for scrap in 1961.

Design and description
They were based on the Royal Navy's s, but with a heavier armament and omitting the minelaying equipment of the British ships. They had a crew of 142 initially, but this was later reduced to 128.

Armament consisted of three  guns in single mounts on the ship's centreline, with two forward and one aft. Four 2-pounder (40 mm) pom-pom anti-aircraft (AA) guns were fitted, while four depth charge throwers provided an anti-submarine armament. In 1943, the 40 mm guns were removed and replaced by five single-mounted  AA cannon.

Construction and career
In 1930, Portugal set up a ten-year plan to modernise its navy. Gonçalo Velho was laid down on 9 October 1931, and launched on 3 August 1932. Construction was completed in May 1933. They were among the ships that formed the core of the fleet until the late 1940s. They were tasked with coastal defence and defence of Portugal's colonial possessions. Following World War II, the ships were reclassified as frigates. Portugal acquired new ships in the postwar era and Gonçalo Velho was broken up for scrap in June 1961.

Citations

References
 
 
 
 

Naval ships of Portugal
1932 ships